Goniorhynchus is a genus of moths of the family Crambidae.

Species
Goniorhynchus butyrosa (Butler, 1879)
Goniorhynchus calamitalis Snellen, 1898 
Goniorhynchus chalybealis Snellen, 1892
Goniorhynchus clausalis (Christoph, 1881)
Goniorhynchus exemplaris Hampson, 1898 
Goniorhynchus flaviguttalis Warren, 1896
Goniorhynchus gratalis (Lederer, 1863)
Goniorhynchus gulielmalis Holland, 1900 
Goniorhynchus hampsoni (Klima, 1939 - replacement name)
Goniorhynchus marasmialis Hampson, 1898
Goniorhynchus marginalis Warren, 1896
Goniorhynchus obscurus Hampson, 1898 
Goniorhynchus octosema Hampson, 1912
Goniorhynchus pasithea (Fawcett, 1916)
Goniorhynchus pectinalis Hampson, 1898 
Goniorhynchus plumbeizonalis Hampson, 1896
Goniorhynchus salaconalis (Druce, 1895)

Former species
Goniorhynchus argyropalis (Hampson, 1908)
Goniorhynchus lasyguialis Hampson, 1912

References

 afromoths.net

Spilomelinae
Crambidae genera
Taxa named by George Hampson